Cameron Achord (born February 4, 1987) is an American football coach who is the special teams coordinator for the New England Patriots of the National Football League (NFL). He previously served as an assistant special teams coach for the Patriots. Achord also previously coached at the University of Southern Mississippi and Southwest Mississippi Community College.

Coaching career

College
From 2010 to 2011, Achord had served as a graduate assistant for the University of Southern Mississippi Golden Eagles under head coach Larry Fedora. Following that, he joined the Southwest Mississippi Community College Bears staff for five years, holding various roles including offensive coordinator, special teams coordinator, quarterbacks coach, running backs coach, and tight ends coach during his tenure.

New England Patriots
In 2018, Achord was hired by the New England Patriots as their assistant special teams coach. In 2020, Achord was promoted to special teams coordinator following the departure of Joe Judge, who left to become the head coach of the New York Giants. He won his first Super Bowl title when the Patriots defeated the Los Angeles Rams in Super Bowl LIII.

Personal life
Achord is a graduate of Brookhaven Academy. He graduated from Belhaven University with degrees in computer information science and sports administration in 2009. He received a master's degree in sports management from the University of Southern Mississippi in 2011.

References

External links
 New England Patriots bio

Living people
New England Patriots coaches
People from Brookhaven, Mississippi
Sportspeople from Mississippi
Belhaven Blazers football players
Belhaven University alumni
University of Southern Mississippi alumni
1987 births